Phase Three of the Marvel Cinematic Universe (MCU) is a series of American superhero films produced by Marvel Studios based on characters that appear in publications by Marvel Comics. The phase began in 2016 with the release of Captain America: Civil War and concluded in 2019 with the release of Spider-Man: Far From Home. It includes the crossover films Avengers: Infinity War, released in 2018, and its sequel Avengers: Endgame, released in 2019. Kevin Feige produced every film in the phase, alongside Amy Pascal for Spider-Man: Homecoming and Spider-Man: Far From Home, and Stephen Broussard for Ant-Man and the Wasp. The eleven films of the phase grossed over $13.5 billion at the global box office and received generally positive critical and public response. Upon release, Avengers: Endgame became the highest-grossing film of all time.

Chris Evans and Tom Holland appeared the most in the phase, each starring or making cameo appearances in five of the Phase Three films. Marvel Studios also created three mockumentary short films centered on Thor, while each of the feature films received tie-in comic books. Phase Three, along with Phase One and Phase Two, make up The Infinity Saga. It was followed by Phase Four.

Development
On October 28, 2014, Marvel Studios President Kevin Feige announced the full slate of films that the studio planned to release as part of Phase Three of the Marvel Cinematic Universe (MCU): Captain America: Civil War (2016), Doctor Strange (2016), Guardians of the Galaxy Vol. 2 (2017), Thor: Ragnarok (2017), Black Panther (2018), Captain Marvel (2018), and Inhumans (2018), as well as Avengers: Infinity War – Part 1 (2018) and Avengers: Infinity War – Part 2 (2019). Feige made this announcement at the El Capitan Theatre in Hollywood, in an event that drew comparisons to Apple's Worldwide Developers Conference. Feige explained that the studio had wanted to announce all of the titles at the 2014 San Diego Comic-Con, but "things were not set" for the slate at that point, so the one-off event was used instead once all of the films could be confirmed. Marvel Studios had never done a solo event such as this before, and Feige had anticipated that it would occur in early August or mid-September before the October date was settled on.

Following the Sony Pictures hack in 2014, it was revealed that Sony and Marvel were having conversations about potentially sharing Spider-Man. Marvel wanted to introduce a new version of Spider-Man in Captain America: Civil War and then continue working with the Avengers in the future, while allowing Sony to keep creative control and use him in their own potential Spider-Man movies and spin-offs, with the potential of possibly using some of Marvel's characters. On February 9, 2015, Marvel made a post on their official website announcing a deal with Sony Pictures to allow Spider-Man to appear in the MCU. In June, Tom Holland was revealed to have been cast as Peter Parker / Spider-Man, and was set to appear in Civil War as well as the next Sony Spider-Man film, which would go on to be Spider-Man: Homecoming (2017). The addition of Homecoming as well as Ant-Man and the Wasp (2018) to the Phase Three slate led to date changes for Ragnarok (later in 2017), Black Panther (2018), and Captain Marvel (2019). Inhumans was removed from the release schedule, though it was not outright canceled. In November 2016, Feige said that "Inhumans will happen for sure. I don't know when. I think it's happening on television. And I think as we get into Phase 4 as I've always said, it could happen as a movie." Shortly after, Marvel Television and IMAX Corporation announced the eight-episode television series Inhumans, to be produced with ABC Studios and air on ABC; Marvel Studios decided that the characters were better suited to television, rather than trying to fit multiple potential Inhumans franchise films around the studio's existing film slate. The Inhumans series was not intended to be a reworking of the planned film.

In July 2016, Avengers: Infinity War – Part 1 was retitled Avengers: Infinity War, while Part 2 was left untitled until the release of the first teaser trailer on December 7, 2018, when it was revealed to be Avengers: Endgame. After the title was revealed, Feige stated that withholding it for so long had backfired on the studio due to the high expectations that fans had set for the reveal. Despite this, Feige stood by the decision due to how the reveal of Infinity War and Endgame before Avengers: Age of Ultron (2015) was released had taken away attention from that film. Civil War, Infinity War, and Endgame were directed by Anthony and Joe Russo and written by Christopher Markus and Stephen McFeely. There was a large amount of collaboration between them and the other Phase Three directors and writers to make sure "everything line[d] up right" for the MCU's "culmination" in Infinity War and Endgame. Peyton Reed, director of Ant-Man (2015) and Ant-Man and the Wasp, felt the relationship and collaboration between the Phase Three directors was "probably the closest thing that this generation will have to a '30s- or '40s-era studio system where you are all on the lot and you are all working on different things."

Films

Captain America: Civil War (2016) 

The Avengers become fractured into two opposing teams, one led by Steve Rogers and another by Tony Stark, after extensive collateral damage prompts politicians to pass an act regulating superhuman activity with government oversight and accountability for the Avengers while also facing against a new enemy, Helmut Zemo, who seeks revenge upon the Avengers.

By January 2014, Anthony and Joe Russo had signed on to return to direct a third Captain America installment, which they confirmed in March 2014, with Chris Evans returning as Captain America, Kevin Feige returning to produce, and Christopher Markus & Stephen McFeely writing the screenplay. In October 2014, the title was officially announced as Captain America: Civil War along with the reveal that Robert Downey Jr. would appear in the film as Tony Stark / Iron Man. The film is an adaptation from the "Civil War" storyline in the comics. It is also the first film of Phase Three. Filming began in April 2015 at Pinewood Atlanta Studios, and concluded in August 2015. Captain America: Civil War had its premiere in Hollywood on April 12, 2016, was released internationally beginning April 27, and was released on May 6 in the United States.

The film is set one year after the events of Avengers: Age of Ultron (2015). Captain America: Civil War introduces Tom Holland as Peter Parker / Spider-Man and Chadwick Boseman as T'Challa / Black Panther to the MCU, who appear in solo films in 2017 and 2018, respectively. William Hurt reprises his role as Thaddeus Ross from The Incredible Hulk (2008), with the character being now the US Secretary of State. For the mid-credits scene, in which T'Challa offers Steve Rogers and Bucky Barnes asylum in Wakanda, Joe and Anthony Russo received input from Black Panther (2018) director Ryan Coogler on the look and design of Wakanda.

Doctor Strange (2016) 

After Stephen Strange, the world's top neurosurgeon, is involved in a car accident that ruins his career, he sets out on a journey of healing, where he encounters the Ancient One, who teaches Strange the use of Mystic Arts and to defend the Earth from mystical threats.

In June 2010, Thomas Dean Donnelly and Joshua Oppenheimer were hired to write the screenplay for a film starring the character Doctor Strange. In January 2013, Feige confirmed that Doctor Strange would be a part of their Phase Three slate of films. In June 2014, Scott Derrickson was hired to direct. In December 2014, Benedict Cumberbatch was cast in the eponymous role, and Jon Spaihts was confirmed to rewrite the script. In December 2015, C. Robert Cargill revealed he was a co-writer on the film, and the following April, revealed that Derrickson also wrote the script. Pre-production began in June 2014, with filming beginning in November 2015 in Nepal, before moving to Longcross Studios in the UK later in the month. Filming concluded in New York City in April 2016. Doctor Strange had its premiere in Hong Kong on October 13, 2016, and was released in the United Kingdom on October 25, 2016, and on November 4 in the United States.

Derrickson stated that the events of Doctor Strange take "roughly" a year, ending "up to date with the rest of the MCU", with Cargill noting it begins in February 2016 and ends later that year. Doctor Strange introduces the Eye of Agamotto, a mystical relic that can manipulate time and is revealed to be an Infinity Stone at the end of the film, specifically the Time Stone. The film's mid-credits scene features a cameo appearance by Chris Hemsworth reprising his MCU role of Thor, meeting with Strange, which was footage from Thor: Ragnarok (2017). The scene was directed by Ragnarok director Taika Waititi.

Guardians of the Galaxy Vol. 2 (2017) 

The Guardians of the Galaxy travel throughout the cosmos and struggle to keep their newfound family together while helping Peter Quill learn more about his true parentage and facing against new enemies.

In July 2014, Guardians of the Galaxy co-writer Nicole Perlman confirmed that James Gunn would return to write and direct the sequel. Chris Pratt returns for the sequel as Peter Quill / Star-Lord, along with the other Guardians from the first film as well as additional cast members. They are joined by Pom Klementieff as Mantis, and Kurt Russell as Ego. In June 2015, the film's title was revealed as Guardians of the Galaxy Vol. 2. Filming began in February 2016 at Pinewood Atlanta Studios, and concluded in June 2016. Guardians of the Galaxy Vol. 2 premiered in Tokyo on April 10, 2017, and was released on May 5, 2017.

The film is set two-to-three months after the events of Guardians of the Galaxy, in 2014. One of the film's post-credit sequences hints at the introduction of Adam Warlock, after Gunn originally intended for Warlock to make a full appearance in Vol. 2. He noted that Warlock could appear in future Guardians films, and is considered "a pretty important part" of the cosmic side of the Marvel Cinematic Universe. The Grandmaster, played by Jeff Goldblum, is seen dancing in the end credits, before his appearance in Thor: Ragnarok.

Spider-Man: Homecoming (2017) 

Peter Parker tries to balance being the hero Spider-Man with his high school life under guidance of Tony Stark as he deals with the threat of the Vulture.

On February 9, 2015, Sony Pictures and Marvel announced that Sony would be releasing a Spider-Man film co-produced by Marvel Studios president Feige and Amy Pascal, with Sony Pictures continuing to own, finance, distribute, and have final creative control of the Spider-Man films. In April 2015, Feige confirmed the character would be Peter Parker and added that Marvel had been working to add Spider-Man to the MCU since at least October 2014, when they announced their full slate of Phase Three films, saying, "Marvel doesn't announce anything officially until it's set in stone. So we went forward with that Plan A in October, with the Plan B being, if [the deal] were to happen with Sony, how it would all shift. We've been thinking about [the Spider-Man film] as long as we've been thinking about Phase Three." In June 2015, Tom Holland was cast in the role of Spider-Man and Jon Watts was hired to direct the film, and the next month, John Francis Daley and Jonathan Goldstein were hired to write the screenplay. Additional screenwriters include Watts and Christopher Ford, and Chris McKenna and Erik Sommers. In April 2016, the title was revealed to be Spider-Man: Homecoming. Production began in June 2016 at Pinewood Atlanta Studios, and concluded in October 2016. Spider-Man: Homecoming premiered on June 28, 2017 in Hollywood, and was released in the United Kingdom on July 5, and the United States on July 7, 2017.

The film is set several months after the events of Captain America: Civil War, which is four years after the events of The Avengers (2012). In April 2016, Feige confirmed that characters from previous MCU films would appear in the film, with Robert Downey Jr. confirmed to reprise his role as Tony Stark / Iron Man shortly thereafter. Jon Favreau, Gwyneth Paltrow, and Evans also reprise their roles as Happy Hogan, Pepper Potts, and Steve Rogers / Captain America, respectively. The cleanup crew Damage Control appear in the film, after previously being referenced in Iron Man (2008) and the television series Agents of S.H.I.E.L.D., ahead of an intended television series about them. Various weaponry and artifacts from previous films are referenced throughout the film that Toomes and his crew repurpose for their weapons. In Parker's high school, one of his classes has a lesson about the Sokovia Accords, and portraits of Bruce Banner, Howard Stark, and Abraham Erskine are seen within the school.

Thor: Ragnarok (2017) 

Thor, trapped on another world without Mjolnir, must survive a gladiatorial duel against the Hulk and return to Asgard in time to stop the villainous Hela and the impending Ragnarök.

In January 2014, Marvel announced that a third Thor film was in development, with Craig Kyle and Christopher L. Yost writing the screenplay, and was officially announced as Thor: Ragnarok in October 2014. By October 2015, Taika Waititi entered in negotiations to direct Thor: Ragnarok. In December 2015, Stephany Folsom was hired to rewrite the script. A year later, in January 2017, it was revealed that Eric Pearson wrote the screenplay, with Kyle, Yost and Folsom receiving story credit. Pearson, Kyle and Yost would ultimately receive screenwriting credit for the film. Hemsworth, Tom Hiddleston, Idris Elba, and Anthony Hopkins reprise their roles as Thor, Loki, Heimdall, and Odin, respectively, and are joined by Cate Blanchett as Hela. Production began in July 2016 in Australia at Village Roadshow Studios, and wrapped in late October 2016. Thor: Ragnarok premiered in Los Angeles on October 10, 2017, began its international release on October 24, 2017 in the United Kingdom, and was released on November 3, 2017 in the United States.

The film is set four years after the events of Thor: The Dark World (2013), two years after the events of Avengers: Age of Ultron, and around the same time period as Captain America: Civil War and Spider-Man: Homecoming. Producer Brad Winderbaum noted that "Things happen on top of each other now in Phase Three. They're not as interlocked as they were in Phase One." Mark Ruffalo reprises his MCU role of Bruce Banner / Hulk, with Benedict Cumberbatch also returning as Dr. Stephen Strange from Doctor Strange. The film reveals that the Infinity Gauntlet first seen in Odin's vault in Thor (2011) was a fake, while also introducing Thanos' ship Sanctuary II in a post-credits scene.

Black Panther (2018) 

T'Challa returns home as sovereign of the nation of Wakanda only to find his dual role of king and protector challenged by a long-time adversary in a conflict that has global consequences.

Documentary filmmaker Mark Bailey was hired to write a script for Black Panther in January 2011. In October 2014, the film was announced and Chadwick Boseman was revealed to be portraying T'Challa / Black Panther. In January 2016, Ryan Coogler was announced as director, and the following month, Joe Robert Cole was confirmed as the film's screenwriter. In April 2016, Feige confirmed that Coogler was a co-screenwriter. Filming began in January 2017 at EUE/Screen Gems Studios in Atlanta, and concluded in April 2017. Black Panther premiered in Los Angeles on January 29, 2018, and began its international release on February 13, 2018, and was released on February 16, 2018 in the United States. The film also had a "cross-nation release" in Africa, a first for a Disney film.

The film is set one week after the events of Captain America: Civil War. Florence Kasumba, Andy Serkis, Martin Freeman, and John Kani reprise their roles as Ayo, Ulysses Klaue, Everett K. Ross and T'Chaka respectively from previous MCU films. The film's post-credits scene features a cameo appearance by Sebastian Stan, reprising his role as Bucky Barnes.

Avengers: Infinity War (2018) 

The Avengers join forces with the Guardians of the Galaxy to try to stop Thanos from collecting all of the Infinity Stones.

The film was announced in October 2014 as Avengers: Infinity War – Part 1. In April 2015, Marvel announced that Anthony and Joe Russo would direct the film and in May, that Christopher Markus and Stephen McFeely would write the screenplay. In July 2016, Marvel revealed the title would be shortened to simply Avengers: Infinity War. Josh Brolin reprises his role as Thanos, and is part of an ensemble cast featuring many actors who have appeared in other MCU films. Filming for Infinity War began in January 2017 in Atlanta, and lasted until July 2017. Additional filming also took place in Scotland. Avengers: Infinity War premiered in Los Angeles on April 23, 2018. It was released worldwide on April 27, 2018, with a few debuts beginning as early as April 25 in a handful of countries.

The film is set two years after the events of Captain America: Civil War. Marvel had been planting the seeds for Infinity War since their early films, by introducing the Infinity Stones as MacGuffins: the Tesseract / Space Stone in Captain America: The First Avenger (2011), Loki's Scepter / Mind Stone in The Avengers, the Aether / Reality Stone in Thor: The Dark World, the Orb / Power Stone in Guardians of the Galaxy, and the Eye of Agamotto / Time Stone in Doctor Strange. Additionally, Thanos is shown holding an empty Infinity Gauntlet in Avengers: Age of Ultron. The Red Skull from The First Avenger appears in the film, played by Ross Marquand instead of Hugo Weaving, and is the keeper of the final Infinity Stone, the Soul Stone. The post-credits scene features Nick Fury transmitting a distress signal on a device, which has the insignia of Captain Marvel.

Ant-Man and the Wasp (2018) 

Scott Lang tries to balance his home life with his responsibilities as Ant-Man, when Hope van Dyne and Hank Pym present him with a new mission, requiring him to team up with Van Dyne as the Wasp.

Ant-Man and the Wasp was announced in October 2015. Peyton Reed confirmed that he would return to direct in November 2015, and that Paul Rudd and Evangeline Lilly would reprise their roles as Scott Lang / Ant-Man and Hope van Dyne / Wasp, respectively. In December 2015, Andrew Barrer, Gabriel Ferrari, and Rudd were confirmed to write the screenplay, with Chris McKenna and Erik Sommers revealed to have also contributed to the script in August 2017. In February 2017, Michael Douglas confirmed he would reprise his role as Hank Pym in the film. Michelle Pfeiffer was revealed as having been cast as Janet van Dyne in July 2017. Filming began in August 2017 in Atlanta with additional filming in San Francisco, and ended in November 2017. Stephen Broussard also served as a producer on the film. Ant-Man and the Wasp had its premiere in Hollywood on June 25, 2018, and was released in the United States on July 6, 2018.

The film is set two years after the events of Captain America: Civil War and before Avengers: Infinity War. In the mid-credits scene, Hope van Dyne, Hank Pym, and Janet van Dyne are disintegrated as a result of the events of Infinity War.

Captain Marvel (2019) 

Carol Danvers becomes Captain Marvel, one of the galaxy's strongest heroes, after the Earth is caught in the center of an intergalactic conflict between two alien worlds.

In May 2013, The Hollywood Reporter reported that Marvel had a working script for Ms. Marvel. In October 2014, Marvel announced the film would be titled Captain Marvel and feature Carol Danvers. In April 2015, Nicole Perlman and Meg LeFauve were announced as screenwriters. At the 2016 San Diego Comic-Con, Brie Larson was confirmed to play the role of Carol Danvers. In April 2017, Anna Boden and Ryan Fleck were hired to direct. That August, Geneva Robertson-Dworet was revealed to be taking over as the film's screenwriter, replacing Perlman and LeFauve. Boden, Fleck, and Robertson-Dworet received final screenplay credits on the film. Location filming occurred in January 2018, while principal photography began in March in Los Angeles and concluded in July. The film was released on March 8, 2019.

The film is set in 1995. Samuel L. Jackson, Djimon Hounsou, Lee Pace, and Clark Gregg reprise their MCU roles as Nick Fury, Korath, Ronan the Accuser, and Phil Coulson, respectively, while the Skrull species are introduced to the MCU. The Russo brothers filmed the mid-credits scene, which was footage supposed to occur offscreen before the first scenes of Avengers: Endgame (2019), and features Chris Evans as Steve Rogers, Scarlett Johansson as Natasha Romanoff, Don Cheadle as James Rhodes, and Mark Ruffalo as Bruce Banner. The post-credits scene shows Goose regurgitating the Tesseract on Fury's desk after swallowing it during the film's third act.

Avengers: Endgame (2019) 

After half of all life in the universe was killed due to the actions of Thanos in Avengers: Infinity War, the remaining Avengers and their allies must reassemble to revert those actions in one final stand.

The film was announced in October 2014 as Avengers: Infinity War – Part 2. In April 2015, it was revealed that Anthony and Joe Russo would direct the film and in May, that Christopher Markus and Stephen McFeely would write the screenplay. In July 2016, Marvel revealed the title would be changed, being known simply at that time as the Untitled Avengers film. Its title was revealed as Avengers: Endgame in December 2018. Brolin reprises his role as Thanos, and is part of an ensemble cast featuring many actors who have appeared in other MCU films. Filming began in August 2017 in Atlanta, and ended in January 2018. The film was released on April 26, 2019.

Avengers: Endgame begins three weeks after the events of Infinity War, before jumping ahead five years. It does not have a post-credits scene, but features the sound of an Iron Man suit being hammered at the end of the credits as a callback to the first MCU film Iron Man, and a teaser trailer for Spider-Man: Far From Home (2019) was played after the credits in some screenings of the film a week after the film released. Endgame was intended to mark the final appearances of Robert Downey Jr. as Tony Stark and Chris Evans as Steve Rogers.

Spider-Man: Far From Home (2019) 

Peter Parker goes on a school trip to Europe with his friends. While abroad, he is recruited by Nick Fury to team up with Quentin Beck to battle the Elementals.

In December 2016, Sony Pictures scheduled a sequel to Spider-Man: Homecoming for release on July 5, 2019. A year later, Watts was confirmed to be returning to direct the film. Chris McKenna and Erik Sommers, two of the writers of the first film, returned to write the script. Holland revealed the film's title as Spider-Man: Far From Home in late June 2018. Filming began in July 2018, in England, with filming also occurring in the Czech Republic, Venice, and New York City. and lasted until October 2018. It was believed that the film would be the first film in Phase Four until April 2019, when Feige first publicly stated Far From Home would serve as the final film of Phase Three. He later added that it would also be the conclusion to "The Infinity Saga". Spider-Man: Far From Home had its premiere in Hollywood on June 26, 2019, and was released in the United States on July 2, 2019.

The film is set eight months after Avengers: Endgame. Jackson and Cobie Smulders reprise their roles as Fury and Maria Hill, respectively, from previous MCU media. The mid-credits scene features J. K. Simmons reprising his role as J. Jonah Jameson, having previously portrayed a different incarnation of the character in Sam Raimi's Spider-Man film trilogy. The post-credits scene features Ben Mendelsohn and Sharon Blynn as the Skrulls Talos and Soren, reprising their roles from Captain Marvel.

Timeline 

For Phase Three, directors the Russo brothers wanted to continue using real time, as was the case with Phase Two, and so Captain America: Civil War begins a year after Age of Ultron, with Avengers: Infinity War set two years after that. However, producer Brad Winderbaum said the Phase Three films would actually "happen on top of each other" while being less "interlocked" as the Phase One films were, with Black Panther and Spider-Man: Homecoming respectively beginning a week and two months after Civil War; Thor: Ragnarok beginning four years after The Dark World and two years after Age of Ultron, which is set around the same time as Civil War and Homecoming; Doctor Strange taking place over a whole year and ending in late 2016, "up to date with the rest of the MCU"; Ant-Man and the Wasp also set two years after Civil War and shortly before Infinity War; and both Guardians of the Galaxy and its sequel Vol. 2 being explicitly set in 2014, which Feige believed would create a four-year gap between Vol. 2 and Infinity War, though the other MCU films up to that point do not specify years onscreen. Captain Marvel is set in 1995. Avengers: Endgame begins shortly after Infinity War and ends in 2023 after a five-year time jump. It confirms dates for several other films, including Doctor Strange around 2017, and Ant-Man and the Wasp in 2018 before Infinity War. Spider-Man: Far From Home begins eight months after Endgame in 2024.

When Spider-Man: Homecoming was being developed, director and co-writer Jon Watts was shown a scroll detailing the MCU timeline that was created by co-producer Eric Carroll when he first began working for Marvel Studios. Watts said the scroll included both where the continuity of the films lined-up and did not lineup, and when fully unfurled it extended beyond the length of a long conference table. This scroll was used as the basis to weave the continuity of Homecoming into the previous films, such as The Avengers. This was labeled in the film with a title card stating that eight years pass between the end of The Avengers and the events of Civil War, which was widely criticized as a continuity error that broke the established MCU timeline, in which only four years should have passed. Additionally, dialogue in Civil War indicates that eight years pass between the end of Iron Man and the events of that film, despite the established continuity being closer to five or six years. Infinity War co-director Joe Russo described the Homecoming eight years time jump as "very incorrect", and the mistake was ignored in Infinity War which specified that its events were taking place only six years after The Avengers. The public response to the Homecoming mistake inspired Marvel Studios to release a new timeline for all three phases.

Recurring cast and characters

Music

Film soundtracks

Compilation albums

Singles

Home media

Reception

Box office performance 

Phase Three is the highest-grossing phase, more than doubling Phase Two's $5.3 billion gross, with six of its eleven films making over $1 billion at the worldwide box office, including Infinity War and Endgame, which each made more than $2 billion. As a result, Infinity War became the fourth-highest-grossing film ever and Endgame the highest-grossing film ever, unadjusted for inflation. Endgame surpassed Infinity War within eleven days of release and dethroned Avatar (2009) on July 21, 2019, after Avatar held the title for nearly a decade, 2019 was the first year that three MCU films made at least $1 billion each, thanks to Captain Marvel, Endgame, and Spider-Man: Far From Home. By doing so, Far From Home became the first Spider-Man film to make $1 billion at the box office.

Critical and public response 

Josh Kurp of Uproxx felt that Phase Three was the strongest of all Marvel Cinematic Universe phases. Conner Schwerdtfeger of CinemaBlend also felt that Phase Three was Marvel's best, citing increase in diverse unique filmmaking style as his main motivator.

Tie-in media

Digital series

WHIH Newsfront

WHIH Newsfront is an in-universe current affairs show that serves as a viral marketing campaign for some of the MCU films, created in partnership with Google for YouTube. The campaign is an extension of the fictional news network WHIH World News, which is seen reporting on major events in the MCU. The videos released during April and May 2016 as a WHIH Newsfront Special Report focus on the Avengers and the political issues surrounding them as part of a viral marketing campaign for Captain America: Civil War. William Sadler reprises his role as President of the United States Matthew Ellis from Iron Man 3 (2013).

The Daily Bugle

The Daily Bugle is an in-universe current affairs show serving as viral marketing campaign for Spider-Man: Far From Home, with six videos released on YouTube during October and November 2019. It is based on the fictional sensationalist news outlet of the same name that appears in the MCU—itself based on the fictional newspaper agency of the same name appearing in several Marvel Comics publications. J. K. Simmons reprises his role as J. Jonah Jameson from the mid-credits scene of Far From Home.

Short films

Comic books

Notes

References 

 
Phase 3